Letsie I Moshoeshoe of Lesotho (1811 – 20 November 1891) was the paramount chief of Basotho (modern Lesotho) from 1870 to November 20, 1891.

References

House of Moshesh
1811 births
1891 deaths
Basutoland people
People of the Basuto Gun War